Kett is a surname. Notable people with the surname include:
Robert Kett (c1492–1549), Loyal Rebel: Leader of Kett's Rebellion
Francis Kett (1547–1589), Anglican clergyman burned for heresy
Hedley Kett (1913–2014), British naval officer and submariner
Henry Kett (1761–1825), versatile English clergyman, academic and writer
Kett Turton (born 1982), Canadian actor
Rlinda Kett, fictional character from the Saga of Seven Suns series of novels by Kevin J. Anderson
Tony Kett (1951–2009), Irish Fianna Fáil politician and member of Seanad Éireann

See also
Etta Kett, long-run comic strip created by Paul Robinson
Kett's Rebellion, enclosure-related revolt in Norfolk during the reign of Edward VI of England
KETT